Belippo eburnensis is a jumping spider species in the genus Belippo that lives in Ivory Coast. It was first identified in 2020. The spider is closely related to Belippo cygniformis and Belippo ibadan.

References

Endemic fauna of Ivory Coast
Salticidae
Spiders described in 2020
Spiders of Africa